Tân Yên is a rural district of Bắc Giang province in the Northeast region of Vietnam. As of 2018 the district had a population of 162,500. The district covers an area of 204 km². The district capital lies at Cao Thượng.

Administrative divisions
The district is divided administratively into two townships: Cao Thượng (the capital) and Nhã Nam, and into the following communes:

Quế Nham
Việt Lập
Liên Chung
Cao Xá
Ngọc Lý
Ngọc Thiện
Ngọc Châu
Ngọc Vân
Hợp Đức
Phúc Hòa
Tân Trung
An Dương
Lan Giới
Nhã Nam
Đại Hóa
Quang Tiến
Phúc Sơn
Lam Cốt
Việt Ngọc
Song Vân
Liên Sơn

References

Districts of Bắc Giang province